Robin Haase was the defending champion but chose not to defend his title.

Steve Darcis won the title after defeating Jordi Samper-Montaña 6–3, 6–4 in the final.

Seeds

Draw

Finals

Top half

Bottom half

References
 Main Draw
 Qualifying Draw

STRABAG Challenger Open - Singles
STRABAG Challenger Open